Agios Dimitrios (Greek: Άγιος Δημήτριος meaning Saint Dimitrios, before 1928: Μπραχάμι - Brahami) is a suburb in the southern part of the Athens, Greece.

Geography
Agios Dimitrios is situated 5 km south of Athens city centre, and 4 km from the Saronic Gulf coast. The municipality has an area of 4.949 km2. Vouliagmenis Avenue connects it with central Athens and the southern suburbs. The suburb is connected with Line 2 of the Athens Metro through Agios Dimitrios metro station.

Climate

Agios Dimitrios has a hot-summer Mediterranean climate (Köppen climate classification: Csa), bordering on a hot semi-arid climate (Köppen climate classification: BSh). Agios Dimitrios experiences hot, dry summers and mild, wetter winters.

History

The settlement developed around the church of Ag.  Dimitrios was the original web of the village of 
Brahami during the interwar period.

In the Turkish occupation, but also after the liberation, all Alimos, and not only, was a vast estate.  His beginning was in St. John the Kareah and extended to Kavouri.  The area, including the agricultural village, belonged to Braham Pasha - by which Aghios Dimitrios is also called Brahami - and to Hassan Pasha, which came from the name Hassani.  All this property was divided into parcels, which the municipality of Athens, to which it belonged, donated or sold.  This resulted in the creation of various settlements.

The Community of Brahami was founded in 1925. Until then the village of Brahami belonged to the municipality of Athens.  By Decree of 1925, Brahami was administered autonomously by the Athenian municipality and was a community comprising the settlements of Brahami, Agia Varvara, Katsipodi (Dafni today), Pikrodafni and Agios Kosmas.  In 1928 the community was renamed Aghios Dimitrios.  It was converted into a municipality of Aghios Dimitrios, which was based in Daphne in 1942.

In 1947, with the Decree issued on September 5, 1947, the settlement of Aghios Dimitrios was seized by the Municipality of Dafni and formed into a separate homonymous community, which included exclusively Brahami.  The final adjustment was made in 1963, when the then Home Secretary G.  Rallies on 15 March approved the conversion of the Community of Aghios Dimitrios into a homonymous municipality, as it is today.

Historical Population

Sports
The most important clubs based in Aghios Dimitrios is the football club Agios Dimitrios F.C. ,Thyella Agiou Dimitriou and the basketball club Cronus Agios Dimitrios.

Twinnings
Pozzuoli, a suburb of Naples in Campania, Italy

References

Municipalities of Attica
Populated places in South Athens (regional unit)